Katheryn Rodríguez Valdez (born 10 September 2002) is a Cuban footballer who plays as a forward for FC Villa Clara and the Cuba women's national team.

Club career
Rodríguez has played for Pococí in Costa Rica and for Villa Clara in Cuba.

International career
Rodríguez capped for Cuba at senior level during the 2020 CONCACAF Women's Olympic Qualifying Championship qualification.

References

2002 births
Living people
Cuban women's footballers
Women's association football forwards
FC Villa Clara players
Cuba women's international footballers
Cuban expatriate footballers
Cuban expatriate sportspeople in Costa Rica
Expatriate women's footballers in Costa Rica
21st-century Cuban women